The Cigarette Girl from Mosselprom is a 1924 Soviet film.
The silent comedy film is directed by Yuri Zhelyabuzhsky and stars Igor Ilyinsky.

Plot

As she works in her tedious office job, Maria Ivanovna dreams about being married, and she has particular hopes that co-worker Nikodim Mityushin (Igor Ilyinsky) will take an interest in her. Nikodim, however, is in love with Zina (Yuliya Solntseva), who sells cigarettes on the sidewalk, and he frequently buys cigarettes from her even though he does not smoke.

One day, a film crew uses Zina as an extra in an outdoor scene, and the cameraman, Latugin (Nikolai Tseretelli), falls in love with her. Latugin soon arranges an acting job for Zina. To complicate matters further, Zina has yet another admirer in Oliver MacBride, an American businessman who is visiting Moscow.

Cast
Igor Ilyinsky as Nikodim Mityushin, bookkeeper
Yuliya Solntseva as Zina Vesenina, cigarette girl
Anna Dmokhovskaya as Maria Ivanovna
Nikolai Tseretelli as Latugin, cameraman
Leonid Baratov as Barsov-Aragonsky, film director
M. Tsybulsky as Oliver Mac-Bride, American

See also
The Three Million Trial
A Kiss From Mary Pickford
Miss Mend

External links

1924 comedy films
1924 films
Soviet black-and-white films
Films about actors
Films set in the Soviet Union
Gorky Film Studio films
Soviet silent feature films
Articles containing video clips
Soviet comedy films
Silent comedy films
1920s Russian-language films